Kerry Metzger is a former member of the Ohio House of Representatives, representing parts of Tuscarawas County and Guernsey County from 1995 to 2002.  He was succeeded in 2003 by Jimmy Stewart.

References

Republican Party members of the Ohio House of Representatives
Living people
21st-century American politicians
Year of birth missing (living people)